Saint-Berthevin is a commune in the Mayenne department in north-western France.

Population

Sights
 11th century Saint-Berthevin church.
 Lime kilns at Les Brosses, listed as a Historic Monument.
 High rock, named the Chair of Saint-Berthevin.
 Coupeau base.
 Old pink marble quarries (Saint-Berthevin marble).
 Chateau du Chatelier.
 Two 18th century boundary stones are classified as historic objects.

See also
Communes of Mayenne

References

Saintberthevin